Varejão is a Portuguese surname. Notable people with the surname include:

Adriana Varejão (born 1964), Brazilian artist
Anderson Varejão (born 1982), Brazilian basketball player
Sandro Varejão (born 1972), Brazilian basketball player

Portuguese-language surnames